Romina Masolini (born 4 November 1976) is an Italian snowboarder. 

She was born in Morbegno. She competed at the 2006 Winter Olympics, in halfpipe. 

She has been known to use Santa Cruz snowboards and Northwave boots

References

External links 
 

1976 births
Living people
People from Sondrio
Italian female snowboarders
Olympic snowboarders of Italy
Snowboarders at the 2006 Winter Olympics
Sportspeople from the Province of Sondrio